Toprakkale can refer to:

 Toprakkale (castle)
 Toprakkale, Aziziye
 Toprakkale, Çayırlı
 Toprakkale, Hınıs
 Toprakkale, Oltu
 Toprakkale, Osmaniye
 Toprakkale–İskendurun railway